Thomas James Denton Birtles (26 October 1886 – 13 January 1971)  was an English footballer who played in The Football League with Barnsley, and he was later a first-class cricketer who played for Yorkshire County Cricket Club between 1913 and 1924.

Football career
Born in Higham, Barnsley, Yorkshire, England, Birtles first played for Higham Town, and then at 17 years old, in the Football League for Barnsley in the 1903–04 season. After playing in the league for them for three seasons he moved to Southern League side Swindon Town where he made 39 appearances for Swindon in all competitions, scoring 8 goals. and Portsmouth. After his time at Portsmouth, Birtles returned to play in the league for Barnsley in 1910–11.

Later, he played with Rotherham County, Northampton Town and finally at Doncaster Rovers, who were at that time in the Midland League.

Cricket career
He was a right-handed batsman who scored 876 runs at 19.04, with a best of 104 against Lancashire in the Roses Match played at Bramall Lane, Sheffield, in July 1914.  Promoted to open the innings in Yorkshire's second innings, his century was by far the highest score of a drawn match.  He also bowled six overs in his career without success.
  
He played for Barnsley Cricket Club for twenty years, and was also coach at Gresham's School, Holt, Norfolk.  In 1913, he headed the Yorkshire 2nd XI batting averages with 413 runs at 51.61.

Birtles died in Attenborough, Nottinghamshire, in January 1971.

References

External links
Cricinfo Profile
Cricket Archive Statistics

1886 births
1971 deaths
Cricketers from Barnsley
Yorkshire cricketers
English cricketers
Association football outside forwards
English Football League players
Barnsley F.C. players
Swindon Town F.C. players
Portsmouth F.C. players
Rotherham County F.C. players
Northampton Town F.C. players
Doncaster Rovers F.C. players
Midland Football League players
People from Attenborough, Nottinghamshire
Footballers from Nottinghamshire
English footballers
English cricketers of 1890 to 1918